The TOJ SC304 is a sports prototype race car, designed, developed and built by German racing team and constructor, Team Obermoser Jörg; conforming to the FIA's Group 6 category and specification of motor racing, in 1976. Over its career, spanning two years, it won one race, scored three podium finishes, and took one pole position. It was powered by a naturally-aspirated  Ford-Cosworth DFV V8 engine, producing .

References

Sports prototypes
24 Hours of Le Mans race cars